Cadphises is a genus of moths belonging to the family Zygaenidae.

Species
Species:

Cadphises azim 
Cadphises maculata 
Cadphises moorei

References

Zygaenidae
Zygaenidae genera